Cobelura vermicularis is a species of longhorn beetle of the subfamily Lamiinae. It was described by Theodor Franz Wilhelm Kirsch in 1889 and is known from Ecuador.

References

Beetles described in 1889
Acanthocinini